Hom Bru are a folk group from Shetland who formed in 1978. They moved to Edinburgh in 1980 and using the city as their base, toured all over Europe.  In 1982 they moved back to Shetland and continue to perform regularly.

The band play a mixture of instrumental music, mainly traditional Shetland and Scandinavian tunes, and songs sung in Shetland dialect.

Personnel

Current members 
 Gary Peterson - tenor banjo, mandolin

 Brian Nicholson - guitar, vocals

 Davie Henry - mandolin, vocals
 John Robert Deyell - fiddle

Previous members 
 Alec Johnson - bass, vocals
 George Faux - fiddle, mandolin, guitar, vocals
 Steven Spence - fiddle
 Peter Miller - bass, guitar, vocals
 Ivor Pottinger - guitar
 John Hutchison - guitar, vocals
 Stewart Isbister - bass, vocals
 Davy Tulloch - fiddle
 Bob Maclaine - fiddle
 Andrew Tulloch - guitar, vocals

Reviews

Discography

The First Swig 

First Swig was Hom Bru's debut album released in 1978. The album was recorded by Douglas Bentley in his Viking Vision "studio" which was actually the front shop of his electrical retail premises. The recording was released on cassette only.

Track listing 
Side 1:
 Nine points of roguery
 Greenland whaling
 Delta dawn
 Till the rivers all run dry
 Gardebylaten

Side 2:
 Never on a Sunday
 Fiddler's green
 Banks of Newfoundland
 The alamo
 Scotland the brave

Personnel 
Davie Henry (vocals, rhythm guitar, mandolin); Alec Johnson (bass, harmony vocals); Gary Peterson (drums, mandolin); Brian Nicholson (vocals)

Obadeea 

Obadeea features a recording of "The Unst Boat Song" which is sung in the old Norn language

Track list 
 Christmas Day/The bonnie Isle of Whalsay (Trad.)/Leather reeches (Trad.)
 Gardebylatten (Trad.)
 Lassie lie near me (Trad.)
 Chicago reel (Trad.)/The scholar (Trad.)/St Anne's reel (B. Scott)
 Ragtime Jane (J. Elliot) - listen
 The new song on the turnout (Lyrics trad, tune G. Faux)
 The brolum (Dr.C.Bannatyne)/Pete da mill (G. Peterson)
 Janine's shell (G. Faux), Sandy Bell's hornpipe (R. Smith)
 Unst boat song (Trad.)
 Garster's dream (Trad.)/Da brig (Stickle)/Da sooth end (W. Hunter)
 Sandy burn reel (F. Jamieson)
 Banks of the bann (Trad.)
 The eighth Black Watch on Passchaendale Ridge (S. Bremner)/John Murray of Lochee (J. Hastings)

Personnel 
Pete Miller (vocals, guitar, electric bass); George Faux (fiddle, mandolin, guitar, vocals); Gary Peterson (mandolin, tenor banjo, fiddle); Ivor Pottinger (guitar)

Rowin Foula Doon

Track list 
 Sylvia / Tulloch's farewell tae da Hagdale
 Rowin' Foula doon - Da song o' da Papamen
 Huckleberry hornpipe / Homesteader's rell / Donkey reel
 Caladonia
 Niamh's capers / Toss the feathers / The pinch of snuff
 Shaskeen / Paddy Faheys / Fair Jenny
 Miss Rowan Davies
 Smugglers
 I'll remember you this way
 Moving cloud

Personnel 
Peter Miller (vocals, guitar); Steven Spence (fiddle); Gary Peterson (mandolin, tenor banjo); Davie Henry (vocals, mandolin); Ivor Pottinger (vocals, guitar)

No Afore Time

Track list 
 Coopers Reels
 Da Sang O' Da Delting Lass
 Suzi's Waltz
 Scarce O' Tatties Set
 Da Sang O' Da Fisher Lad
 Recuerdos De La Alhambra
 Hornpipes
 Da Trowie Song
 Serendipity
 Hoedown Set
 High Rockin Swing
 Da Lass O' Hascosay
 Bonnie Nancy
 The Harley Set
 Simmer Dim

Personnel 
Brian Nicholson (vocals, guitar, bass guitar); John Robert Deyell (fiddle); Gary Peterson (mandolin, tenor banjo); Davie Henry (vocals, mandolin); John Hutchison (vocals, guitar)

References

External links 
 Archived copy of official website

Shetland music
Scottish folk music groups